Sarah Walker (born c.1965/66) is a British music broadcaster for BBC Radio 3.

Walker studied music at Royal Holloway, University of London and Reading University, and in 1995 gained a doctorate in English experimental music.

Sarah Walker presented Radio 3's mid-morning programme Essential Classics, alternating with Rob Cowan.  She has also contributed to the 'Building a Library' feature of CD Review (and its predecessor Record Review) and to other BBC network programmes. She currently presents Sunday Morning.

References

External links
Sunday Morning (BBC Radio 3)
Sarah Walker on Twitter

1960s births
Living people
Alumni of City, University of London
Alumni of Goldsmiths, University of London
Alumni of the University of Reading
BBC Radio 3 presenters
Year of birth missing (living people)